Oak Hill High School (OHS) is a K-12 school in Hineston, Louisiana. It is part of the Rapides Parish School District and has elementary school and high school divisions.

Athletics
Oak Hill High athletics competes in the LHSAA.

References

External links
 Oak Hill High School

Schools in Rapides Parish, Louisiana
Public K-12 schools in Louisiana